This is a list of numbered provincial highways in the Canadian province of New Brunswick. These provincial highways are maintained by the Department of Transportation and Infrastructure in New Brunswick. For a list of formerly-numbered highways, see List of former New Brunswick provincial highways.


Arterial highways 
Marked by green signs, these highways are the primary routes in the system, and Routes 1, 2, 7, 8, 11, 15, 16 and 95 are all expressways or freeways for part or all of their length.

Collector highways 
Marked by blue signs, these secondary highways are sometimes the old alignments of primary highways or connector routes between towns or to and from primary highways. The speed limit is generally .

 Route 100 -- Saint John - Rothesay - Quispamsis - Hampton
 Route 101 -- Fredericton - Tracy - Fredericton Junction - Welsford
 Route 102 -- Pokiok - Kingsclear - Fredericton - Oromocto - Gagetown - Westfield
 Route 103 -- Woodstock - Florenceville
 Route 104 -- Hartland - Millville - Keswick Ridge
 Route 105 -- Grand Falls - Perth-Andover - Bristol - Florenceville - Hartland - Grafton - Nackawic - Mactaquac - Fredericton - Jemseg - Youngs Cove
 Route 106 -- Petitcodiac - Salisbury - Moncton - Dieppe - Memramcook - Dorchester - Sackville
 Route 107 -- Bristol - Juniper - Stanley - Nashwaak Bridge
 Route 108 -- Grand Falls - Plaster Rock - Renous-Quarryville - Miramichi
 Route 109 -- Perth-Andover - Plaster Rock
 Route 110 -- Florenceville - Centreville - U.S. border at Bridgewater, Maine
 Route 111 -- Rothesay - Saint John Airport - St. Martins - Sussex Corner
 Route 112 -- Coles Island - Canaan Forks - Salisbury - Riverview
 Route 113 -- Pokemouche - Shippagan - Lamèque - Miscou Island
 Route 114 -- Sussex - Fundy National Park - Riverside-Albert - Hillsborough - Riverview - Moncton
 Route 115 -- Moncton - Saint-Antoine - Bouctouche
 Route 116 -- Upper Salmon Creek - Harcourt - Elsipogtog First Nation - Rexton
 Route 117 -- Kouchibouguac National Park - Baie-Sainte-Anne - Miramichi
 Route 118 -- Blackville - Miramichi
 Route 119 -- Quispamsis - Gondola Point
 -- Edmundston - Baker Brook - Lac-Baker - Quebec border at Saint-Jean-de-la-Lande
 Route 121 -- Hampton - Norton - Sussex - Sussex Corner
 Route 122 -- Meductic - Canterbury - Fosterville - U.S. border at Orient, Maine

 Route 123 -- Chipman - Doaktown
 Route 124 -- Evandale - Springfield - Norton
 Route 126 -- Moncton - Harcourt - Rogersville - Miramichi
 Route 127 -- Lawrence Station - St. Andrews - Digdeguash
 Route 128 -- Moncton - Berry Mills
 Route 130 -- Grand Falls - Grand Falls Portage - Aroostook - Perth-Andover - Florenceville-Bristol - Hartland - Waterville
 Route 132 -- Dieppe - Scoudouc - Shediac
 Route 133 -- Shediac - Cap-Pele
 Route 134 -- Moncton - Shediac - Bouctouche - Rexton - Richibucto - St-Louis-de-Kent / Allardville - Bathurst - Beresford - Belledune - Charlo - Dalhousie - Campbellton
 Route 135 -- Pokeshaw - Paquetville - Saint-Isidore
 Route 140 -- Shediac (Ohio Road)
 Route 144 -- Edmundston - Saint-Léonard - Grand Falls
 Route 145 -- Caraquet - Bas-Caraquet
 Route 148 -- Fredericton - Nashwaak Village
 Route 150 -- Tracadie-Sheila - Losier Settlement - Six Roads
 Route 160 -- Allardville - Saint-Isidore - Losier Settlement
 Route 161 -- Caron Brook - Clair
 Route 165 -- Woodstock - Meductic
 Route 170 -- St. Stephen - Waweig
 Route 172 -- St. George - L'Etete
 Route 175 -- Pennfield - Lepreau
 Route 176 -- Pennfield - Blacks Harbour
 Route 177 -- Grand Bay - Westfield
 Route 180 -- Saint-Quentin - Bathurst
 Route 190 -- Perth-Andover - U.S. border at Fort Fairfield, Maine

Local highways 
Marked by black signs, these are the tertiary routes that fill out the highway network and connect small communities and areas to more important highways. The speed limit is generally  or lower depending on road design standards.

 Route 205 -- Clair - Saint-François-de-Madawaska - Connors
 Route 215 -- Saint-François-de-Madawaska - Lac Unique -  Route 289 (Quebec)
 Route 218 -- Grand Falls - U.S. border crossing at Hamlin, Maine
 Route 255 -- Saint-André - Route 17
 Route 260 -- Rang-Douze-Sud - Rang-Quatorze - Limerick - Saint-Martin-de-Restigouche - Thibault - Kedgwick
 Route 265 -- Kedgwick River - Six-Milles - Quatre-Milles - Rang-Double-Nord
 Route 275 -- Glencoe - Val-Melanson - Saint-Arthur - McKendrick - Maltais - Blair Athol - Upper Balmoral - Balmoral - Selwood - Eel River Crossing - Darlington
 Route 280 -- McLeods - Upper Dundee - Shannonvale - Dundee - Eel River Cove - Charlo
 Route 303 -- Dugas - Village-des-Poirier - Maisonnette
 Route 305 -- Lamèque - Ste-Marie-St-Raphaël - Pigeon Hill
 Route 310 -- Lamèque Island (Coteau Road)
 Route 313 -- Lamèque - Petite-Lamèque - Petite-Rivière-de-l'Ile - Petit-Shippagan
 Route 315 -- Bathurst - Dunlop - Nigadoo - LaPlante - Petit-Rocher
 Route 320 -- Grande-Anse - Anse-Bleue - Maisonnette
 Route 322 -- Bathurst - Robertville - Saint-Laurent - Nigadoo
 Route 325 -- Caraquet -Bertrand - Trudel
 Route 330 -- Black Rock - Saint-Léolin - Grande-Anse Route 335 -- Caraquet - Saint-Simon - Evangeline
 Route 340 -- Janeville - Notre-Dame-des-Erables - Paquetville
 Route 345 -- Pokemouche - Evangeline - Inkerman Ferry
 Route 350 -- Paquetville - Maltampec - Pokemouche
 Route 355 -- Bois-Blanc - Sainte-Rose - Six Roads
 Route 360 -- Allardville - Middle Landing - Brunswick Mines
 Route 363 -- Saint-Sauveur - Butte D'Or - Spruce Brook - Hacheyville
 Route 365 -- Saint-Isidore - Tracadie
 Route 370 -- Riviere-du-Portage - Pont-Lafrance - Sheila
 Route 375 -- Lower Portage - US border Route 380 -- Lake Edward - Bell Grove - Three Brooks
 Route 385 -- Weaver - Mapleview - Burntland Brook - Oxbow - Everett - Two Brooks - Blue Mountain Bend - Riley Brook - Nictau - Mount Carleton Provincial Park - Route 180 (Saint-Quentin to Bathurst)
 Route 390 -- Plaster Rock - Wapske - Odell - Arthurette - Rowena - Tobique Narrows
 Route 395 -- Hazedean - Anfield - McLaughlin - Route 109
 Route 415 -- Renous-Quarryville - Warwick Settlement - Red Bank
 Route 420 -- Derby Junction - Red Bank - Sillikers - Interchange with Route 108 (Renous-Quarryville)
 Route 425 -- Red Bank - Sunny Corner - Whitney - Strathadam - Eel Ground - Miramichi Route 430 -- Miramichi -- Heath Steele—Bathurst Mines -- Bathurst Route 435 -- Whitney -- Maple Glen
 Route 440 -- Rogersville - Shediac Ridge - Rosaireville - St. Margaret's
 Route 445 -- Lagacéville - Fairisle - Covedell
 Route 450 -- Village-Saint-Laurent - Lagacéville - Lavillette - Route 8
 Route 455 -- Neguac - Fairisle - Lavillette
 Route 460 -- Neguac - Price Settlement - Gaythorne - Tabusintac
 Route 465 -- Coal Branch - Ford's Mills - Smith's Corner
 Route 470 -- Ford's Mills - Pine Ridge - Mundleville
 Route 475 -- Bouctouche - Baie de Bouctouche - Saint-Édouard-de-Kent - Sainte-Anne-de-Kent
 Route 480 -- Kouchibouguac - Acadieville - Acadie Siding
 Route 485 -- Canaan - Route 490
 Route 490 -- Moncton - Irishtown - McLean Settlement - Pine Ridge - Browns Yard - Bass River
 Route 495 -- Rexton - Mundleville - Murphy Settlement - Sainte-Marie-de-Kent
 Route 505 -- Sainte-Anne-de-Kent - Richibucto-Village - Rexton
 Route 510 -- Mundleville - Browns Yard - Fords Mills
 Route 515 -- Hebert - McLean Settlement - Sainte-Marie-de-Kent - Bouctouche
 Route 525 -- Sainte-Marie-de-Kent - Saint-Antoine
 Route 530 -- Grande-Digue - Caissie Cape - Cocagne
 Route 535 -- Notre-Dame - Cocagne - Saint-Francois-de-Kent
 Route 540 -- Graham Corner - Debec - Richmond Corner - Belleville
 Route 550 -- Woodstock - Bloomfield - Tracey Mills (Route 110)
 Route 555 -- Woodstock - Richmond Corner - Route 95
 Route 560 -- Woodstock - Lakeville - Centreville - River de Chute (Route 130)
 Route 565 -- Upper Kent- Holmesville - Giberson Settlement - Bath Route 570 -- Gordonsville - Coldstream
 Route 575 -- Hartland - Pole Hill - Cloverdale

 Route 580 -- Glassville - Lower Windsor
 Route 585 -- Woodstock - Grafton - Hawkins Corner
 Route 590 -- Jacksonville - Waterville
 Route 595 -- Bull Lake - Temperance Vale
 Route 605 -- Millville - Nackawic Route 610 -- Upper Queensbury - Upper Caverhill - Upper Hainesville
 Route 615 -- Mactaquac - Springfield -- Upper Caverhill
 Route 616 -- Keswick Ridge - Zealand
 Route 617 -- Burtts Corner - Birdton - Hamtown Corner
 Route 620 -- Fredericton - Tay Creek - Stanley Route 625 -- Boiestown - Parker Ridge - Cross Creek
 Route 628 -- Fredericton - Penniac - Durham Bridge - Taymouth
 Route 630 -- Canterbury - Andersonville
 Route 635 -- Lower Prince William - Lake George - Magaguadavic - York Mills
 Route 636 -- Lake George - Harvey Station Route 640 -- Fredericton - Hanwell - Acton
 Route 645 -- Hurley Corner - Rooth - Tracy Route 655 -- Nasonworth - Rusagonis-Waasis - Lincoln
 Route 670 -- Lakeville Corner - Ripples - Albrights Corner
 Route 690 -- Sheffield - Lakeville Corner - Douglas Harbour - Newcastle Creek - Minto Route 695 -- Springfield - Cambridge-Narrows - Jemseg
 Route 705 -- Kars - Wickham - MacDonald Point - Belyeas Cove - Henderson Settlement
 Route 710 -- Hatfield Point - Henderson Settlement - Big Cove - Cambridge-Narrows - Codys - Chambers Corner
 Route 715 -- Jemseg - Lower Cambridge - Cambridge-Narrows - Coles Island
 Route 725 -- St. Stephen - Little Ridge - St. Croix River
 Route 730 -- Upper Little Ridge - Scotch Ridge - Basswood Ridge - DeWolfe
 Route 735 -- St. Stephen - Scotch Ridge - St. Croix River
 Route 740 -- St. Stephen - Basswood Ridge
 Route 745 -- Moores Mills - Oak Hill - Canoose - St. Croix River
 Route 750 -- Honeydale - Moores Mills - Maxwell Crossing - St. Stephen Route 755 -- Andersonville - Honeydale - Oak Bay
 Route 760 -- Simpson Corner - Waweig - Elmsville - Bethel (Route 1)
 Route 770 -- Route 127 - Rollingdam - Clarence Ridge - Bonny River - St. George Route 772 -- Deer Island
 Route 774 -- Campobello Island
 Route 776 -- Grand Manan Island Route 778 -- Pennfield - Beaver Harbour - Blacks Harbour
 Route 780 -- St. George - Utopia -  Lepreau
 Route 785 -- Pennfield - Utopia - Mount Pleasant - Blissville
 Route 790 -- Lepreau - Dipper Harbour - Chance Harbour - Musquash
 Route 795 -- Lepreau - Wetmore Creek
 Route 820 -- Loch Lomond - Upham - Upperton (Route 111)
 Route 825 -- Loch Lomond - Garnett Settlement - Gardner Creek - Simonds
 Route 845 -- Kingston - Hampton Route 850 -- Kingston - Urquhart - Erbs Cove - Long Point - Keirsteadville - Springfield
 Route 855 -- Midland - Bloomfield
 Route 860 -- Saint John - Rothesay (Wells) - French Village - Titusville - Clover Hill
 Route 865 -- Norton - Clover Hill - Hillsdale
 Route 870 -- Springfield - Belleisle Creek - Kierstead Mountain
 Route 875 -- Belleisle Creek - Searsville - Lower Millstream
 Route 880 -- Apohaqui - Berwick - Havelock
 Route 885 -- Petitcodiac - Havelock - New Canaan
 Route 890 -- Sussex - Cornhill - Petitcodiac Route 895 -- Anagance - Portage Vale - Goshen - Elgin - Little River - Coverdale
 Route 905 -- Petitcodiac - Elgin
 Route 910 -- Coverdale - Caledonia Mountain - Hillsborough Route 915 -- Riverside-Albert - Cape Enrage - Alma Route 925 -- Dieppe - Dover - Memramcook Route 933 -- Memramcook - Haute-Aboujagane - Barachois
 Route 935 -- Dorchester - Johnson's Mills - Sackville Route 940 -- Sackville - Shemogue
 Route 945 -- Haute-Aboujagane - Beaubassin-Est - Cap-Pelé Route 950 -- Cap-Pelé - Petit-Cap - Shemogue
 Route 955 -- Mates Corner - Chapmans Corner - Cadman Corner - Murray Corner - Spence Settlement - Bayfield - Cape Tormentine
 Route 960 -- Port Elgin - Upper Cape - Cape Spear - Cape Tormentine
 Route 970 -- Port Elgin - Baie Verte -  (Nova Scotia)

 Other highways 
The following roads are designated provincial highways by the New Brunswick Department of Transportation, but have no signed numerical designation:Deer Island Point Road - Route from Deer Island (New Brunswick) that connects Route 772 to Route 774 on Campobello Island via Cummings Cove to Welshpool Ferry and also from Deer Island (New Brunswick) New Brunswick Route 772 to Maine State Route 190 in Eastport, Maine via Cummings Cove to Eastport Ferry.Gunningsville Bridge and approaches, Moncton to Riverview (2.2 km)Palmer Brook Connector (1.6 km): Connector from Route 100 to Route 1 east of Quispamsis, and former alignment of Route 1.Prospect Street Extension, Fredericton (2.7 km): A former alignment of Route 2 from Hanwell Road (Route 640) to Woodstock Road (Route 102).Rue Principale, Tracadie-Sheila (7.4 km): A former alignment of Route 11.Vanier Boulevard, Bathurst (1.7 km): A continuation of Route 180 from Route 11 to St. Peter Boulevard (Route 134).Westmorland Street Bridge''', Fredericton (1.6 km)

See also

References

External links 

New Brunswick provincial highways
 
Highways